The Kazikumukhsky okrug was a district (okrug) of the Dagestan Oblast of the Caucasus Viceroyalty of the Russian Empire. The area of the Kazikumukhsky okrug is included in contemporary Dagestan of the Russian Federation. The district's administrative centre was Kumukh.

Administrative divisions 
The subcounties (uchastoks) of the Kazikumukhsky okrug were as follows:

Demographics

Russian Empire Census 
The majority of the population indicated Kazi-Kumukh to be their mother tongue, with significant Dargin and Avar speaking minorities.

Kavkazskiy kalendar 

Notes

References

Bibliography 

Okrugs of Dagestan Oblast